Events in the year 1628 in Norway.

Incumbents
Monarch: Christian IV

Events
 18 January - The Norwegian Army is established.

Arts and literature

Births

Deaths

See also

References